Timeline of anthropology, 1940–1949

Events

1940
The oldest known North American mummy, Spirit Cave Man, is excavated
Prehistoric paintings in the Lascaux caves are discovered
1949
The Human Relations Area Files (HRAF) is founded at Yale University

Publications

1940
Race, Language and Culture, by Franz BoasAfrican Political Systems, ed. by Meyer Fortes and E. E. Evans-Pritchard
1944The People of Alor by Cora Du BoisConfigurations of Culture Growth by Alfred KroeberThe Great Transformation by Karl Polanyi
1949The Hero with a Thousand Faces, by Joseph CampbellLes structures élémentaires de la parenté (The Elementary Structures of Kinship''), by Claude Lévi-Strauss

Births
1940
Michael Taussig
Bruce Kapferer
1941
H. James Birx
Richard Dawkins
1942
Yoram Bilu
Ulf Hannerz
Meave Leakey
1943
Eduardo Archetti
1944
Richard Leakey
Nancy Scheper-Hughes
1948
Kirsten Hastrup
Ian Hodder
Tim Ingold
David Kertzer
1949
Stephen Feld
Ian Hodder

Deaths
1940
James Frazer
Alexander Goldenweiser
Alfred Cort Haddon
Charles Seligman
1941
Carl Vilhelm Hartman
Elsie Clews Parsons
Benjamin Whorf
1942
Franz Boas
Bronislaw Malinowski
1943
Mark Cohen
Katsuyoshi Fukui
Aleš Hrdlička
Donald Johanson
1948
Ruth Benedict

Anthropology by decade
Anthropology
Anthropology timelines
1940s decade overviews